Hermann or Herrmann may refer to:

 Hermann (name), list of people with this name
 Arminius, chieftain of the Germanic Cherusci tribe in the 1st century, known as Hermann in the German language
 Éditions Hermann, French publisher
 Hermann, Missouri, a town on the Missouri River in the United States
 Hermann AVA, Missouri wine region
 The German SC1000 bomb of World War II was nicknamed the "Hermann" by the British, in reference to Hermann Göring
 Herrmann Hall, the former Hotel Del Monte, at the Naval Postgraduate School, Monterey, California
 Memorial Hermann Healthcare System, a large health system in Southeast Texas
 The Herrmann Brain Dominance Instrument (HBDI), a system to measure and describe thinking preferences in people
 Hermann station (disambiguation), stations of the name
 Hermann (crater), a small lunar impact crater in the western Oceanus Procellarum
 Hermann Huppen, a Belgian comic book artist
 Hermann 19, an American sailboat design built by Ted Hermann's Boat Shop
 Hermann 22, an American sailboat design built by Ted Hermann's Boat Shop

See also
 Heermann (disambiguation)
 Herman (disambiguation)